The Body Beautiful is a musical with a book by Joseph Stein and Will Glickman, lyrics by Sheldon Harnick, and music by Jerry Bock.

The first collaboration by Harnick and Bock, and the only one to have a contemporary setting, its plot focuses on a wealthy Dartmouth College graduate who aspires to be a prize-winning boxer and the girl he loves who disapproves of his ambitions.  His fight manager must cope with uninspired fighters, two ex-wives and a new girlfriend.

After a tryout at the Erlanger Theatre in Philadelphia, Pennsylvania, the Broadway production, directed by George Schaefer and choreographed by Herbert Ross, opened on January 23, 1958, at The Broadway Theatre, where it ran for 60 performances. The cast included Mindy Carson, Steve Forrest, Jack Warden, Barbara McNair, William Hickey, and Brock Peters.

Journalist Dorothy Kilgallen and her husband Richard Kollmar co-produced the short-run musical, along with Albert W. Selden. Kilgallen, very visible due to her appearances as a panelist on network TV's What's My Line?, and her fellow panelists made mention of The Body Beautiful on various episodes of the game show during this time period.

In fact, during one live telecast of the Sunday-night staple on CBS, a well-built man named Ed Becker, one of the cast members of the ill-fated musical, appeared as a contestant with his line identified as "chorus boy."   Becker stumped Kilgallen and the rest of the panel much to the delight of host John Charles Daly.

Despite the failure of The Body Beautiful, its score captured the attention of theatrical director George Abbott and producer Hal Prince.  They hired the songwriting team of Harnick and Bock for their next project, the politically themed Fiorello!, which proved to be a hit.  Its success paved the way for a creative team including Prince to pitch Fiddler on the Roof to financial backers with songs from Harnick and Bock as an important part of the pitch.  Upon that show's Broadway premiere in September 1964, it became an overnight sensation, was presented in many foreign countries and eventually became a staple of Jewish culture throughout the world.

Song list

Act I
Where Are They?
The Body Beautiful
Pffft!
Fair Warning
Leave Well Enough Alone
Blonde Blues
Blonde Blues Dance
Uh-Huh, Oh Yeah!
All of These and More
Nobility
The Body Beautiful (Reprise)

Act II
Summer Is
The Honeymoon is Over
Just My Luck
All of These and More (Reprise)
Art of Conversation
Gloria
A Relatively Simple Affair
Finale

References

External links
Internet Broadway Database listing
Time magazine review
 Clip from What's My Line with the "chorus boy"

1958 musicals
Broadway musicals
Boxing mass media
Musicals by Jerry Bock
Musicals by Sheldon Harnick
Musicals by Joseph Stein